The Marienberg or Marienberg Hills languages are a branch of the Torricelli language family. They are spoken in a mountainous stretch of region located between the towns of Wewak and Angoram in the Marienberg Hills of East Sepik Province, Papua New Guinea.

Kamasau is the best documented Marienberg language.

Typology
Marienberg languages distinguish masculine and feminine genders, with feminine being the default unmarked gender.

Unlike all other Torricelli branches except for the Monumbo languages, word order in the Bogia languages is SOV, likely due to contact with Lower Sepik-Ramu and Sepik languages.

Languages
Foley (2018) provides the following classification, based primarily on morphological evidence.

Buna, Blabla (Elapi / Samap)
Kamasau
Bungain
Muniwara, Urimo, Mandi (Wiarumus)

Pronouns
Pronouns in selected Marienberg Hill languages:

{| 
! pronoun !! Muniwara !! Bungain !! Buna
|-
! 1SG
| ŋa || ŋan || ŋa
|-
! 2SG
| nu || nu || no
|-
! 3M.SG
| na || neŋ || den
|-
! 3M.SG
| wo || veŋ || gwen
|-
! 1PL
| ŋam || ŋaŋ || ŋam
|-
! 2PL
| num || nuŋ || nom
|-
! 3M.PL
| ma || meŋ || bon
|-
! 3F.PL
| kwo || ceŋ || en
|}

References

 

 
Sepik Coast languages